María Rojo is a Mexican actress and politician. She was born in Mexico City. Rojo began her career in Mexico, with a role on Teatro Fantástico TV series, before starring in films, such as: Las poquianchis, in 1976; Rojo amanecer, in 1989; El callejón de los milagros, in 1995; El Infierno, in 2010.

She also participated in the successful telenovelas, such as: Cuando llega el amor in 1990, La antorcha encendida in 1996 (in which she played the role of Josefa Ortiz de Dominguez, Te Sigo Amando in 1996, Alborada in 2005-2006, Mañana es para siempre in 2008-2009, Corazón Salvaje in 2009-2010 and she returns to the telenovela in 2014, Hasta el fin del mundo. Rojo also participated in Mexican TV series such as:  Mujeres Asesinas in 2008-2010, and Gritos de Muerte y Libertad in 2010, and in many theatre plays.

After establishing a successful career as an actress, Maria Rojo began her political career as member of Party of the Democratic Revolution, where she has held very important political positions. She is a member of the Senate of Mexico.

Television

Filmography

References 
 General

 
 

 Specific

External links 

 

Actress filmographies
Mexican filmographies